The 2014 Green Bay Blizzard season was the team's twelfth season as a professional indoor football franchise and fifth in the Indoor Football League (IFL). One of nine teams competing in the IFL for the 2014 season, the Green Bay Blizzard were members of the United Conference. The team played their home games at the Resch Center in the Green Bay suburb of Ashwaubenon, Wisconsin.

The Blizzard began the 2014 season under head coach Chad Baldwin. After the team began the season 0–6, Baldwin was replaced by offensive coordinator Tommie Williams for the remainder of the season.

History
The Blizzard struggled during the 2013 season, replacing head coach Robert Fuller after six games with Chad Baldwin and ending the regular season with a 4–10 record. The team did not qualify for the playoffs but drew an average attendance of 3,812 for their seven regular season games.

After failing to turn reach certain unspecified "financial benchmarks", three of the four principal owners of the team agreed to place the Green Bay franchise for sale in late June 2013. If a new owner was not found by September 1, 2013, the franchise planned to suspend operations for the 2014 IFL season. On September 19, local business people Larry and Kathy Treankler were announced as the new principal owners of the Blizzard with former Green Bay Packers star Ahman Green remaining as a co-owner.

Off-field moves
The team has scheduled a series of promotional events for the 2014 season. These include St. Patrick's Day Hat on March 16, Youth Jersey Night on April 12, Bart Starr Bobblehead Night on May 3, Military Appreciation and Youth Hat Night on May 17, and Receiver Glove Night on May 31.

In mid-April, the team fired head coach Chad Baldwin after the Blizzard lost their first six games of the 2014 season. Baldwin amassed a 3–11 record at Green Bay after taking over from Robert Fuller under similar circumstances the previous season. The team promoted offensive coordinator Tommie Williams to head coach as Baldwin's replacement.

Roster moves
In late January 2014, the Blizzard announced the re-signing of offensive linemen William Maxwell and Tyler Hendrickson plus linebacker Derek Earls for the 2014 season.

Awards and honors
On February 26, 2014, the IFL announced its Week 1 Players of the Week. Honorable Mentions were made for quarterback Taylor Perkins for offense and wide receiver/kick returner Donte Sawyer for special teams play.

On March 12, 2014, the IFL announced its Week 3 Players of the Week. Green Bay Blizzard running back Lucien Walker received an Honorable Mention for offense. On March 19, 2014, the IFL announced its Week 4 Players of the Week. Green Bay Blizzard defensive back James Ackel received an Honorable Mention for defense. On March 26, 2014, the IFL announced its Week 5 Players of the Week. Green Bay Blizzard linebacker Derek Earls received an Honorable Mention for defense.

On April 2, 2014, the IFL announced its Week 6 Players of the Week. Green Bay Blizzard wide receiver Andre London and quarterback Nate Wara each received an Honorable Mention for offense. Wide receiver/kick returner Daron Clark received an Honorable Mention for special teams play. On April 16, 2014, the IFL announced its Week 8 Players of the Week. Green Bay Blizzard running back Lucien Walker received his second Honorable Mention for offense. On April 23, 2014, the IFL announced its Week 9 Players of the Week. Green Bay Blizzard quarterback Nate Wara received an Honorable Mention for offense.

Schedule
Key:

Regular season

♥ Rescheduled from April 26 due to arena scheduling conflicts

Roster

Standings

References

External links
Green Bay Blizzard official website
Green Bay Blizzard official statistics
Green Bay Blizzard at Green Bay Press-Gazette

Green Bay Blizzard seasons
Green Bay Blizzard
Green Bay Blizzard